EPIC Racing (Euskadi Phil Imanol Claudio Racing) was a racing team from Spain.  The team's headquarters were located in Vitoria (Alava). It was the second major motorsport team from the Basque Country, (Euskadi).  Epsilon Euskadi was the biggest one and ran their own team in World Series by Renault and Formula Renault before selling the racing division to EPIC Racing in March 2011 in a bid to run the World Series by Renault with both FR3.5 and FR2.0 when Epsilon Euskadi ran into financial trouble and allowed all personnel involved to maintain their jobs.

Epic Racing was born from a sell out of Epsilon Euskadi and not a name change as it mistakenly written in several places. Nevertheless, Epsilon Euskadi continued non-racing activities until 2013 when administrators took the lead of the operations.

In 2008 Epsilon Euskadi participated in sports car racing for the first time with their Epsilon Euskadi ee1 car.

Bid for Formula One
This page is mistakenly written for EPIC Racing. It is only related  to Epsilon Euskadi.

Although the team announced on June 3, 2009 that it had submitted an entry for the Formula 1 World Championship for 2010, the FIA did not list them amongst the 13 teams in the preliminary entry list released on June 12, 2009. They were however placed on the reserve list in case one of the 13 teams withdrew, but the withdrawal of USF1 took place too late for this contingency to operate.

In March 2010 Epsilon Euskadi announced it applied to enter the 2011 Formula One championship, following the failure of US F1 to use the entry they had been granted. This application was also unsuccessful.

Corruption 

Epsilon Euskadi sponsored EPIC Racing with public funding of the Basque Country government.

In 2013 Epsilon Euskadi ee1 founder Joan Villadelprat and Mark Phillip Payne were taken to court in Vitoria (Spain) under allegations of corruption and negligent management of public funding granted by the Basque Country government when Juan Jose Ibarratxe was president of the Basque Country.

Results 

The results of EPIC Racing are only the ones during  2011 season. Previous seasons  are Epsilon Euskadi results only

World Series by Renault

 D.C. = Drivers' Championship position, T.C. = Teams' Championship position.

Sports car 

Again this chapter is only Epsilon Euskadi. EPIC Racing also purchased the LMP section of Epsilon Euskadi but never competed or ran the cars again.

References

External links

 
 Epsilon Euskadi

Spanish auto racing teams
Auto racing teams established in 1999
1999 establishments in Spain
European Le Mans Series teams
24 Hours of Le Mans teams
World Series Formula V8 3.5 teams
Formula Renault Eurocup teams
GP3 Series teams

British Formula Renault teams
Racecar constructors
Red Bull sports teams